Filippo Sgarbi (born 29 December 1997), is an Italian professional footballer who plays as a central defender for Perugia.

Career
On 2 July 2018 he joined Perugia.

References

External links

1997 births
Living people
Italian footballers
Association football defenders
F.C. Südtirol players
Inter Milan players
A.C. Perugia Calcio players
Serie B players
Serie C players
S.C. Caronnese S.S.D. players